Monsec (Limousin: Montsec) is a former commune in the Dordogne department in Nouvelle-Aquitaine in southwestern France. On 1 January 2017, it was merged into the new commune Mareuil en Périgord.

Geography
Monsec is in the Northwest of the Dordogne Department. The town is situated along the river Belle, a tributary of the Lizonne. The town of Monsec is situated on the border of the departmental road 939 which connects Périgueux and Angoulême.

In 2016, the year preceding the creation of the commune of Mareuil en Périgord, Monsec was neighbored by five communes: Champeaux-et-la-Chapelle-Pommier, Saint-Crépin-de-Richemont, Saint-Félix-de-Bourdeilles, Léguillac-de-Cercles, and Vieux-Mareuil.

Population

See also
 Communes of the Dordogne department

References

Former communes of Dordogne